The 2002 New York Yankees season was the 100th season for the Yankees. The team finished with a record of 103-58 finishing 10.5 games ahead of the Boston Red Sox. New York was managed by Joe Torre. The Yankees played at Yankee Stadium. 2002 was a transition year for the Yankees, as they soldiered on without Paul O'Neill, Tino Martinez, Scott Brosius and Chuck Knoblauch, main pieces in the 1990s dynasty. In the playoffs, they lost in the ALDS in 4 games to the Anaheim Angels, marking the 2002 Yankees season a failure as they did not advance to a World Series for the first time since 1997; failing to win their fifth straight pennant; they did not win a World Championship, giving the team a 2-year title drought.

Offseason
 December 7, 2001: David Justice was traded by the Yankees to the New York Mets for Robin Ventura.
December 13, 2001: John Vander Wal was traded by the San Francisco Giants to the Yankees for Jay Witasick.
December 13, 2001:  Jason Giambi, a free agent, signed a 7-year $120-million deal with the Yankees.
January 8, 2002: Luis Sojo was signed as a free agent with the New York Yankees.
January 11, 2002: David Wells was signed as a free agent with the Yankees.
January 17, 2002: Clay Bellinger was released by the Yankees.
January 28, 2002: Ron Coomer was signed as a free agent with the Yankees.
 March 27, 2002: Bobby Estalella was released by the Yankees.

Broadcasting changes
Beginning this season, the newly launched YES Network began airing regular season games, taking over from MSG Network, cable rights holder for these games until the 2001 season. The on-air team of Ken Singleton and Jim Kaat was moved from MSG to YES beginning this season, while Michael Kay joined as play-by-play commentator beginning this season in addition to radio duties, and they also added retired right fielder Paul O'Neill and former Yankees pitcher David Cone as color commentators; in addition, the over-the-air Yankees games were moved from Fox owned and operated station WNYW to CBS owned and operated station WCBS-TV; Bobby Murcer remained as a play-by-play announcer for the games on over-the-air television. Also beginning this season, the radio broadcasts of Yankees games moved from WABC-AM to CBS Radio-owned AM station WCBS-AM which was a sibling to TV over-the-air rights holder WCBS-TV.

Regular season

Opening Day starters

Season standings

American League Wild Card

Record vs. opponents

Notable transactions
April 8, 2002: Bill Pulsipher was signed as a free agent with the New York Yankees.
May 23, 2002: Bill Pulsipher was released by the New York Yankees.
July 1, 2002: Raúl Mondesí was traded by the Toronto Blue Jays to the New York Yankees for Scott Wiggins.
July 5, 2002: Ted Lilly was traded as part of a 3-team trade by the New York Yankees with Jason Arnold (minors) and John-Ford Griffin to the Oakland Athletics. The Oakland Athletics sent a player to be named later, Carlos Peña, and Franklyn Germán to the Detroit Tigers. The Detroit Tigers sent Jeff Weaver to the New York Yankees. The Detroit Tigers sent cash to the Oakland Athletics. The Oakland Athletics sent Jeremy Bonderman (August 22, 2002) to the Detroit Tigers to complete the trade.

Roster

Game log 

|- bgcolor="ffbbbb"
| 1 || April 1 || @ Orioles || 3–10 || Erickson (1–0) || Clemens (0–1) || — || Oriole Park at Camden Yards || 48,058 || 0–1
|- bgcolor="bbffbb"
| 2 || April 3 || @ Orioles || 1–0 || Wells (1–0) || Johnson (0–1) || Rivera (1) || Oriole Park at Camden Yards || 32,142 || 1–1
|- bgcolor="bbffbb"
| 3 || April 4 || @ Orioles || 4–1 || Mussina (1–0) || Ponson (0–1) || Rivera (2) || Oriole Park at Camden Yards || 33,317 || 2–1
|- bgcolor="bbffbb"
| 4 || April 5 || Devil Rays || 4–0 || Pettitte (1–0) || Kennedy (0–1) || — || Yankee Stadium || 55,771 || 3–1
|- bgcolor="bbffbb"
| 5 || April 6 || Devil Rays || 3–0 || O. Hernandez (1–0) || Alvarez (0–1) || Rivera (3) || Yankee Stadium || 39,093 || 4–1
|- bgcolor="bbffbb"
| 6 || April 7 || Devil Rays || 7–2 || Clemens (1–1) || Sturtze (0–1) || — || Yankee Stadium || 37,343 || 5–1
|- bgcolor="bbffbb"
| 7 || April 8 || @ Blue Jays || 16–3 || Wells (2–0) || Prokopec (0–1) || — || SkyDome || 16,073 || 6–1
|- bgcolor="bbffbb"
| 8 || April 9 || @ Blue Jays || 5–2 || Mussina (2–0) || Plesac (0–1) || Rivera (4) || SkyDome || 18,003 || 7–1
|- bgcolor="ffbbbb"
| 9 || April 10 || @ Blue Jays || 7–9 || Borbon (1–0) || Lilly (0–1) || Escobar (1) || SkyDome || 19,124 || 7–2
|- bgcolor="ffbbbb"
| 10 || April 11 || @ Blue Jays || 3–11 || Eyre (1–0) || Clemens (1–2) || — || SkyDome || 20,091 || 7–3
|- bgcolor="ffbbbb"
| 11 || April 12 || @ Red Sox || 2–3 || Oliver (1–0) || O. Hernandez (1–1) || Urbina (4) || Fenway Park || 32,812 || 7–4
|- bgcolor="ffbbbb"
| 12 || April 13 || @ Red Sox || 6–7 || Arrojo (1–0) || Rivera (0–1) || Urbina (5) || Fenway Park || 33,756 || 7–5
|- bgcolor="bbffbb"
| 13 || April 14 || @ Red Sox || 6–2 || Mussina (3–0) || Wakefield (1–1) || Rivera (5) || Fenway Park || 33,742 || 8–5
|- bgcolor="ffbbbb"
| 14 || April 15 || @ Red Sox || 3–4 || Lowe (2–1) || Pettitte (1–1) || Urbina (6) || Fenway Park || 33,864 || 8–6
|- bgcolor="ffbbbb"
| 15 || April 16 || Orioles || 4–5 || Bauer (1–0) || Mendoza (0–1) || Julio (1) || Yankee Stadium || 33,721 || 8–7
|- bgcolor="bbffbb"
| 16 || April 17 || Orioles || 7–1 || O. Hernandez (2–1) || Towers (0–3) || — || Yankee Stadium || 27,912 || 9–7
|- bgcolor="bbffbb"
| 17 || April 18 || Orioles || 8–4 || Wells (3–0) || Erickson (1–2) || — || Yankee Stadium || 35,212 || 10–7
|- bgcolor="bbffbb"
| 18 || April 19 || Blue Jays || 6–5 || Rivera (1–1) || File (0–1) || — || Yankee Stadium || 36,136 || 11–7
|- bgcolor="ffbbbb"
| 19 || April 20 || Blue Jays || 4–5  || Plesac (1–1) || Mendoza (0–2) || — || Yankee Stadium || 39,265 || 11–8
|- bgcolor="bbffbb"
| 20 || April 21 || Blue Jays || 9–2 || Clemens (2–2) || Carpenter (0–1) || — || Yankee Stadium || 43,309 || 12–8
|- bgcolor="bbffbb"
| 21 || April 23 || @ Athletics || 2–1 || O. Hernandez (3–1) || Hudson (2–2) || Rivera (6) || Network Associates Coliseum || 40,360 || 13–8
|- bgcolor="bbffbb"
| 22 || April 24 || @ Athletics || 8–5 || Stanton (1–0) || Magnante (0–1) || Rivera (7) || Network Associates Coliseum || 54,513 || 13–9
|- bgcolor="ffbbbb"
| 23 || April 25 || @ Athletics || 2–6 || Zito (1–1) || Mussina (3–1) || — || Network Associates Coliseum || 31,870 || 14–9
|- bgcolor="bbffbb"
| 24 || April 26 || @ Mariners || 7–1 || Clemens (3–2) || Baldwin (2–1) || — || Safeco Field || 45,814 || 15–9
|- bgcolor="ffbbbb"
| 25 || April 27 || @ Mariners || 0–1 || Garcia (3–2) || Lilly (0–2) || Sasaki (7) || Safeco Field || 46,047 || 15–10
|- bgcolor="bbffbb"
| 26 || April 28 || @ Mariners || 4–3 || Karsay (1–0) || Rhodes (1–1) || Rivera (8) || Safeco Field || 46,115 || 16–10
|- bgcolor="bbffbb"
| 27 || April 30 || Athletics || 8–2 || Wells (4–0) || Zito (1–2) || — || Yankee Stadium || 32,888 || 17–10

|- bgcolor="ffbbbb"
| 28 || May 1 || Athletics || 1–4 || Hiljus (3–1) || Mussina (3–2) || Koch (6) || Yankee Stadium || 31,006 || 17–11
|- bgcolor="bbffbb"
| 29 || May 2 || Athletics || 9–2 || Clemens (4–2) || Lidle (1–4) || — || Yankee Stadium || 30,463 || 18–11
|- bgcolor="ffbbbb"
| 30 || May 3 || Mariners || 2–6 || Garcia (4–2) || Lilly (0–3) || — || Yankee Stadium || 47,918 || 18–12
|- bgcolor="ffbbbb"
| 31 || May 4 || Mariners || 5–9 || Nelson (1–0) || Karsay (1–1) || — || Yankee Stadium || 52,081 || 18–13
|- bgcolor="ffbbbb"
| 32 || May 5 || Mariners || 6–10 || Pineiro (2–0) || Wells (4–1) || — || Yankee Stadium || 48,176 || 18–14
|- bgcolor="bbffbb"
| 33 || May 7 || @ Devil Rays || 5–2 || Mussina (4–2) || Wilson (1–3) || Rivera (9) || Tropicana Field || 15,031 || 19–14
|- bgcolor="bbffbb"
| 34 || May 8 || @ Devil Rays || 7–2 || Clemens (5–2) || James (0–3) || — || Tropicana Field || 15,263 || 20–14
|- bgcolor="bbffbb"
| 35 || May 9 || @ Devil Rays || 3–1 || O. Hernandez (4–1) || Kennedy (1–3) || Rivera (10) || Tropicana Field || 16,013 || 21–14
|- bgcolor="bbffbb"
| 36 || May 10 || @ Twins || 5–3 || Wells (5–1) || Milton (4–3) || Rivera (11) || Hubert H. Humphrey Metrodome || 35,727 || 22–14
|- bgcolor="bbffbb"
| 37 || May 11 || @ Twins || 4–2 || Stanton (2–0) || Guardado (0–1) || Rivera (12) || Hubert H. Humphrey Metrodome || 43,265 || 23–14
|- bgcolor="bbffbb"
| 38 || May 12 || @ Twins || 10–4 || Mussina (5–2) || Reed (4–2) || — || Hubert H. Humphrey Metrodome || 26,165 || 24–14
|- bgcolor="bbffbb"
| 39 || May 14 || Devil Rays || 10–3 || Clemens (6–2) || Harper (0–1) || — || Yankee Stadium || 29,503 || 25–14
|- bgcolor="ffbbbb"
| 40 || May 15 || Devil Rays || 7–10 || Kennedy (2–3) || O. Hernandez (4–2) || Yan (6) || Yankee Stadium || 26,571 || 25–15
|- bgcolor="bbffbb"
| 41 || May 16 || Devil Rays || 13–0 || Wells (6–1) || Rupe (3–5) || — || Yankee Stadium || 32,695 || 26–15
|- bgcolor="bbffbb"
| 42 || May 17 || Twins || 13–12  || Hitchcock (1–0) || Trombley (0–1) || — || Yankee Stadium || 39,470 || 27–15
|- bgcolor="bbffbb"
| 43 || May 18 || Twins || 6–2 || Lilly (1–3) || Fiore (2–1) || — || Yankee Stadium || 46,057 || 28–15
|- bgcolor="bbffbb"
| 44 || May 19 || Twins || 3–0 || Clemens (7–2) || Kinney (1–4) || Rivera (13) || Yankee Stadium || 53,662 || 29–15
|- bgcolor="bbffbb"
| 45 || May 20 || Blue Jays || 6–3 || Mendoza (1–2) || Heredia (0–1) || Rivera (14) || Yankee Stadium || 30,657 || 30–15
|- bgcolor="bbffbb"
| 46 || May 21 || Blue Jays || 4–1 || Mussina (6–2) || Prokopec (2–6) || Karsay (1) || Yankee Stadium || 26,531 || 31–15
|- bgcolor="ffbbbb"
| 47 || May 22 || Blue Jays || 3–8 || Halladay (5–1) || A. Hernandez (0–1) || — || Yankee Stadium || 44,284 || 31–16
|- bgcolor="ffbbbb"
| 48 || May 23 || @ Red Sox || 1–3 || Martinez (7–0) || Lilly (1–4) || Urbina (15) || Fenway Park || 33,884 || 31–17
|- bgcolor="ffbbbb"
| 49 || May 24 || @ Red Sox || 8–9  || Arrojo (3–1) || Karsay (1–2) || — || Fenway Park || 34,175 || 31–18
|- bgcolor="bbffbb"
| 50 || May 25 || @ Red Sox || 3–2 || Mendoza (2–2) || Lowe (7–2) || Rivera (15) || Fenway Park || 33,743 || 32–18
|- bgcolor="bbffbb"
| 51 || May 26 || @ Red Sox || 14–5 || Mussina (7–2) || Oliver (4–4) || — || Fenway Park || 34,096 || 33–18
|- bgcolor="bbffbb"
| 52 || May 27 || @ White Sox || 10–6 || Thurman (1–0) || Wright (5–5) || — || Comiskey Park || 43,781 || 34–18
|- bgcolor="bbffbb"
| 53 || May 28 || @ White Sox || 4–2 || Lilly (2–4) || Garland (5–4) || Rivera (16) || Comiskey Park || 27,859 || 35–18
|- bgcolor="bbffbb"
| 54 || May 29 || @ White Sox || 6–3 || Karsay (2–2) || Foulke (0–3) || Rivera (17) || Comiskey Park || 27,572 || 36–18
|- bgcolor="ffbbbb"
| 55 || May 31 || Red Sox || 2–5 || Lowe (8–2) || Wells (6–2) || — || Yankee Stadium || 52,941 || 36–19

|- bgcolor="bbffbb"
| 56 || June 1 || Red Sox || 10–2 || Mussina (8–2) || Oliver (4–5) || — || Yankee Stadium || 55,699 || 37–19
|- bgcolor="ffbbbb"
| 57 || June 2 || Red Sox || 1–7 || Castillo (4–5) || Lilly (2–5) || — || Yankee Stadium || 55,602 || 37–20
|- bgcolor="ffbbbb"
| 58 || June 3 || Orioles || 3–4 || Julio (3–4) || Rivera (1–2) || — || Yankee Stadium || 31,476 || 37–21
|- bgcolor="bbffbb"
| 59 || June 4 || Orioles || 13–5 || Mendoza (3–2) || Erickson (3–6) || — || Yankee Stadium || 32,214 || 38–21
|- bgcolor="ffbbbb"
| 60 || June 5 || Orioles || 3–4 || Driskill (3–0) || Wells (6–3) || Julio (10) || Yankee Stadium || 26,506 || 38–22
|- bgcolor="bbbbbb"
| – || June 6 || Orioles || colspan=8|Postponed (rain) Rescheduled for September 10
|- bgcolor="bbffbb"
| 61 || June 7 || Giants || 2–1 || Mussina (9–2) || Hernandez (5–6) || Rivera (18) || Yankee Stadium || 55,053 || 39–22
|- bgcolor="ffbbbb"
| 62 || June 8 || Giants || 3–4 || Schmidt (2–1) || Rivera (1–3) || Nen (16) || Yankee Stadium || 55,194 || 39–23
|- bgcolor="bbffbb"
| 63 || June 9 || Giants || 4–2 || Clemens (8–2) || Rodriguez (1–3) || Karsay (2) || Yankee Stadium || 55,335 || 40–23
|- bgcolor="bbffbb"
| 64 || June 10 || Diamondbacks || 7–5 || Stanton (3–0) || Johnson (9–2) || — || Yankee Stadium || 45,698 || 41–23
|- bgcolor="bbffbb"
| 65 || June 11 || Diamondbacks || 6–4 || Wells (7–3) || Anderson (1–6) || Mendoza (1) || Yankee Stadium || 44,734 || 42–23
|- bgcolor="ffbbbb"
| 66 || June 12 || Diamondbacks || 5–9 || Batista (4–3) || Mussina (9–3) || Kim (17) || Yankee Stadium || 50,864 || 42–24
|- bgcolor="bbffbb"
| 67 || June 14 || @ Mets || 4–2  || Karsay (3–2) || Komiyama (0–3) || — || Shea Stadium || 54,069 || 43–24
|- bgcolor="ffbbbb"
| 68 || June 15 || @ Mets || 0–8 || Estes (3–5) || Clemens (8–3) || — || Shea Stadium || 54,347 || 43–25
|- bgcolor="ffbbbb"
| 69 || June 16 || @ Mets || 2–3 || Guthrie (1–0) || Wells (7–4) || Benitez (15) || Shea Stadium || 55,141 || 43–26
|- bgcolor="bbffbb"
| 70 || June 18 || @ Rockies || 10–5 || Mussina (10–3) || Jennings (8–3) || Stanton (1) || Coors Field || 48,738 || 44–26
|- bgcolor="bbffbb"
| 71 || June 19 || @ Rockies || 20–10 || Mendoza (4–2) || White (1–5) || — || Coors Field || 48,821 || 45–26
|- bgcolor="ffbbbb"
| 72 || June 20 || @ Rockies || 11–14  || Stark (4–1) || Karsay (3–3) || — || Coors Field || 48,916 || 45–27
|- bgcolor="ffbbbb"
| 73 || June 21 || @ Padres || 1–9 || Perez (2–0) || Wells (7–5) || — || Qualcomm Stadium || 55,858 || 45–28
|- bgcolor="bbffbb"
| 74 || June 22 || @ Padres || 1–0 || Lilly (3–5) || Peavy (0–1) || — || Qualcomm Stadium || 60,021 || 46–28
|- bgcolor="bbffbb"
| 75 || June 23 || @ Padres || 3–2 || Mendoza (5–2) || Reed (1–3) ||Karsay (3) || Qualcomm Stadium || 50,050 || 47–28
|- bgcolor="ffbbbb"
| 76 || June 25 || @ Orioles || 3–4 || Roberts (4–2) || Pettitte (1–2) || Julio (16) || Oriole Park at Camden Yards || 41,583 || 47–29
|- bgcolor="ffbbbb"
| 77 || June 26 || @ Orioles || 7–8 || Roberts (5–2) || Stanton (3–1) || — || Oriole Park at Camden Yards || 42,670 || 47–30
|- bgcolor="bbffbb"
| 78 || June 27 || @ Orioles || 3–2 || Wells (8–5) || Erickson (3–7) || Rivera (19) || Oriole Park at Camden Yards || 48,057 || 48–30
|- bgcolor="bbffbb"
| 79 || June 28 || Mets || 11–5 || Mussina (11–3) || D'Amico (4–7) || O. Hernandez (1) || Yankee Stadium || 55,739 || 49–30
|- bgcolor="ffbbbb"
| 80 || June 29 || Mets || 2–11 || Leiter (8–6) || Lilly (3–6) || — || Yankee Stadium || 55,615 || 49–31
|- bgcolor="bbffbb"
| 81 || June 30 || Mets || 8–0 || Pettitte (2–2) || Trachsel (6–7) || — || Yankee Stadium || 55,700 || 50–31

|- bgcolor="bbffbb"
| 82 || July 2 || Indians || 10–5 || Mendoza (6–2) || Rincon (0–3) || — || Yankee Stadium || 45,589 || 51–31
|- bgcolor="bbffbb"
| 83 || July 3 || Indians || 11–8 || Wells (9–5) || Sabathia (6–7) || Rivera (20) || Yankee Stadium || 39,879 || 52–31
|- bgcolor="bbffbb"
| 84 || July 4 || Indians || 7–1 || Mussina (12–3) || Finley (4–11) || — || Yankee Stadium || 42,909 || 53–31
|- bgcolor="bbffbb"
| 85 || July 5 || Blue Jays || 6–3 || O. Hernandez (5–2) || Loaiza (3–5) || Rivera (21) || Yankee Stadium || 46,788 || 54–31
|- bgcolor="ffbbbb"
| 86 || July 6 || Blue Jays || 3–8 || Parris (1–2) || Pettitte (2–3) || — || Yankee Stadium || 55,005 || 54–32
|- bgcolor="bbffbb"
| 87 || July 7 || Blue Jays || 10–6 || Weaver (7–8) || Thurman (1–2) || — || Yankee Stadium || 46,922 || 55–32
|- bgcolor="bbcaff"
| colspan=10 | 73rd All-Star Game in Milwaukee, Wisconsin
|- bgcolor="bbffbb"
| 88 || July 11 || @ Indians || 7–4 || Pettitte (3–3) || Sabathia (6–8) || Rivera (22) || Jacobs Field || 41,192 || 56–32
|- bgcolor="ffbbbb"
| 89 || July 12 || @ Indians || 1–2  || Wohlers (1–1) || Karsay (3–4) || — || Jacobs Field || 42,518 || 56–33
|- bgcolor="bbffbb"
| 90 || July 13 || @ Indians || 14–5 || Wells (10–5) || Drese (8–7) || — || Jacobs Field || 42,631 || 57–33
|- bgcolor="ffbbbb"
| 91 || July 14 || @ Indians || 7–10 || Rincon (1–3) || Rivera (1–4) || — || Jacobs Field || 42,573 || 57–34
|- bgcolor="ffbbbb"
| 92 || July 15 || @ Blue Jays || 5–8 || Parris (2–2) || O. Hernandez (5–3) || Escobar (15) || SkyDome || 25,371 || 57–35
|- bgcolor="bbffbb"
| 93 || July 16 || @ Blue Jays || 7–6 || Karsay (4–4) || Politte (3–3) || Rivera (23) || SkyDome || 27,197 || 58–35
|- bgcolor="bbffbb"
| 94 || July 17 || Tigers || 2–1 || Pettitte (4–3) || Redman (5–9) || — || Yankee Stadium || 49,116 || 59–35
|- bgcolor="bbffbb"
| 95 || July 18 || Tigers || 6–5 || Mendoza (7–2) || Rodney (1–3) || Rivera (24) || Yankee Stadium || 54,725 || 60–35
|- bgcolor="ffbbbb"
| 96 || July 19 || Red Sox || 2–4 || Martinez (12–2) || Mussina (12–4) || Urbina (24) || Yankee Stadium || 55,510 || 60–36
|- bgcolor="bbffbb"
| 97 || July 20 || Red Sox || 9–8  || Karsay (5–4) || Gomes (1–2) || — || Yankee Stadium || 55,526 || 61–36
|- bgcolor="bbffbb"
| 98 || July 21 || Red Sox || 9–8 || Stanton (4–1) || Urbina (1–5) || — || Yankee Stadium || 55,581 || 62–36
|- bgcolor="ffbbbb"
| 99 || July 23 || @ Indians || 3–9 || Baez (8–7) || Pettitte (4–4) || — || Jacobs Field || 38,520 || 62–37
|- bgcolor="bbffbb"
| 100 || July 24 || @ Indians || 14–7 || Wells (11–5) || Drese (8–8) || — || Jacobs Field || 38,081 || 63–37
|- bgcolor="bbffbb"
| 101 || July 26 || @ Devil Rays || 12–9 || Mussina (13–4) || Sosa (1–3) || Karsay (4) || Tropicana Field || 22,527 || 64–37
|- bgcolor="ffbbbb"
| 102 || July 27 || @ Devil Rays || 4–7 || Harper (4–6) || Weaver (7–9) || Yan (14) || Tropicana Field || 35,021 || 64–38
|- bgcolor="bbffbb"
| 103 || July 28 || @ Devil Rays || 9–1 || Pettitte (5–4) || Sturtze (1–11) || — || Tropicana Field || 29,144 || 65–38
|- bgcolor="bbffbb"
| 104 || July 29 || @ Rangers || 9–2 || O. Hernandez (6–3) || Rogers (11–6) || — || The Ballpark in Arlington || 44,006 || 66–38
|- bgcolor="bbffbb"
| 105 || July 30 || @ Rangers || 9–6 || Wells (12–5) || Myette (0–3) || Mendoza (2) || The Ballpark in Arlington || 42,818 || 67–38
|- bgcolor="ffbbbb"
| 106 || July 31 || @ Rangers || 6–17 || Bell (4–3) || Mussina (13–5) || — || The Ballpark in Arlington || 41,133 || 67–39

|- bgcolor="ffbbbb"
| 107 || August 1 || @ Angels || 1–2 || Washburn (13–3) || Weaver (7–10) || Percival (25) || Edison International Field of Anaheim || 42,897 || 67–40
|- bgcolor="bbffbb"
| 108 || August 2 || @ Angels || 4–0 || Pettitte (6–4) || Appier (9–9) || Mendoza (3) || Edison International Field of Anaheim || 43,668 || 68–40
|- bgcolor="ffbbbb"
| 109 || August 3 || @ Angels || 4–5 || Percival (4–1) || Mendoza (7–3) || — || Edison International Field of Anaheim || 43,619 || 68–41
|- bgcolor="bbffbb"
| 110 || August 4 || @ Angels || 7–5  || Stanton (5–1) || Shields (3–2) || Mendoza (4) || Edison International Field of Anaheim || 43,455 || 69–41
|- bgcolor="ffbbbb"
| 111 || August 6 || Royals || 2–6 || Ru. Hernandez (2–1) || Mussina (13–6) || — || Yankee Stadium || 48,275 || 69–42
|- bgcolor="bbffbb"
| 112 || August 7 || Royals || 6–2 || Clemens (9–3) || Suppan (8–11) || — || Yankee Stadium || 40,184 || 70–42
|- bgcolor="bbffbb"
| 113 || August 8 || Royals || 6–3 || Pettitte (7–4) || Byrd (14–8) || Rivera (25) || Yankee Stadium || 55,142 || 71–42
|- bgcolor="ffbbbb"
| 114 || August 9 || Athletics || 2–3  || Bowie (2–0) || Hitchcock (1–1) || — || Yankee Stadium || 54,316 || 71–43
|- bgcolor="ffbbbb"
| 115 || August 10 || Athletics || 0–8 || Lidle (5–9) || Wells (12–6) || — || Yankee Stadium || 54,439 || 71–44
|- bgcolor="bbffbb"
| 116 || August 11 || Athletics || 8–5 || Mussina (14–6) || Mulder (13–7) || — || Yankee Stadium || 54,703 || 72–44
|- bgcolor="bbffbb"
| 117 || August 13 || @ Royals || 10–5 || Clemens (10–3) || Suppan (8–12) || — || Kauffman Stadium || 28,834 || 73–44
|- bgcolor="bbffbb"
| 118 || August 14 || @ Royals || 3–2 || Mendoza (8–3) || Stein (0–3) || Rivera (26) || Kauffman Stadium || 26,383 || 74–44
|- bgcolor="bbffbb"
| 119 || August 15 || @ Royals || 7–5  || Stanton (6–1) || Ro. Hernandez (1–3) || Rivera (27) || Kauffman Stadium || 27,565 || 75–44
|- bgcolor="bbffbb"
| 120 || August 16 || @ Mariners || 9–3 || Wells (13–6) || Halama (5–4) || Weaver (1) || Safeco Field || 46,033 || 76–44
|- bgcolor="bbffbb"
| 121 || August 17 || @ Mariners || 8–3 || Mussina (15–6) || Franklin (4–3) || Karsay (5) || Safeco Field || 46,174 || 77–44
|- bgcolor="ffbbbb"
| 122 || August 18 || @ Mariners || 2–5 || Pineiro (13–4) || Clemens (10–4) || Sasaki (31) || Safeco Field || 46,086 || 77–45
|- bgcolor="bbffbb"
| 123 || August 20 || Angels || 7–5 || Pettitte (8–4) || Sele (8–9) || Stanton (2) || Yankee Stadium || 41,619 || 78–45
|- bgcolor="ffbbbb"
| 124 || August 21 || Angels || 1–5  || Weber (5–2) || Weaver (7–11) || — || Yankee Stadium || 46,423 || 78–46
|- bgcolor="bbffbb"
| 125 || August 22 || Angels || 4–2 || Wells (14–6) || Lackey (5–3) || Karsay (6) || Yankee Stadium || 43,222 || 79–46
|- bgcolor="ffbbbb"
| 126 || August 23 || Rangers || 2–6 || Park (5–6) || Mussina (15–7) || — || Yankee Stadium || 50,871 || 79–47
|- bgcolor="bbffbb"
| 127 || August 24 || Rangers || 3–2 || Clemens (11–4) || Alvarez (0–4) || Karsay (7) || Yankee Stadium || 53,494 || 80–47
|- bgcolor="ffbbbb"
| 128 || August 25 || Rangers || 2–6 || Benoit (3–2) || Pettitte (8–5) || — || Yankee Stadium || 50,037 || 80–48
|- bgcolor="bbffbb"
| 129 || August 26 || Rangers || 10–3 || O. Hernandez (7–3) || Rogers (12–7) || Weaver (2) || Yankee Stadium || 42,785 || 81–48
|- bgcolor="bbffbb"
| 130 || August 27 || @ Red Sox || 6–0 || Wells (15–6) || Fossum (2–3) || — || Fenway Park || 33,810 || 82–48
|- bgcolor="bbffbb"
| 131 || August 28 || @ Red Sox || 7–0 || Mussina (16–7) || Martinez (17–4) || — || Fenway Park || 33,793 || 83–48
|- bgcolor="ffbbbb"
| 132 || August 29 || @ Blue Jays || 4–7 || Loaiza (7–7) || Clemens (11–5) || — || SkyDome || 32,679 || 83–49
|- bgcolor="bbffbb"
| 133 || August 30 || @ Blue Jays || 9–7 || Weaver (8–11) || Walker (7–4) || Karsay (8) || SkyDome || 24,301 || 84–49
|- bgcolor="ffbbbb"
| 134 || August 31 || @ Blue Jays || 1–5 || Miller (6–4) || O. Hernandez (7–4) || — || SkyDome || 36,021 || 84–50
|-

|- bgcolor="ffbbbb"
| 135 || September 1 || @ Blue Jays || 6–7 || Halladay (15–6) || Wells (15–7) || Escobar (28) || SkyDome || 32,577 || 84–51
|- bgcolor="ffbbbb"
| 136 || September 2 || Red Sox || 4–8 || Fossum (3–3) || Mussina (16–8) || — || Yankee Stadium || 55,169 || 84–52
|- bgcolor="bbffbb"
| 137 || September 3 || Red Sox || 4–2 || Clemens (12–5) || Castillo (5–13) || Stanton (3) || Yankee Stadium || 47,318 || 85–52
|- bgcolor="bbffbb"
| 138 || September 4 || Red Sox || 3–1 || Pettitte (9–5) || Lowe (18–7) || Karsay (9) || Yankee Stadium || 50,006 || 86–52
|- bgcolor="bbffbb"
| 139 || September 5 || Tigers || 9–3 || O. Hernandez (8–4) || Sparks (8–15) || — || Yankee Stadium || 28,222 || 87–52
|- bgcolor="bbffbb"
| 140 || September 6 || Tigers || 8–1 || Wells (16–7) || Redman (8–14) || — || Yankee Stadium || 41,114 || 88–52
|- bgcolor="ffbbbb"
| 141 || September 7 || Tigers || 1–2 || German (1–0) || Mussina (16–9) || Acevedo (28) || Yankee Stadium || 40,541 || 88–53
|- bgcolor="bbffbb"
| 142 || September 8 || Tigers || 6–4 || Stanton (7–1) || Henriquez (1–1) || Karsay (10) || Yankee Stadium || 39,302 || 89–53
|- bgcolor="bbffbb"
| 143 || September 10  || Orioles || 5–2 || Pettitte (10–5) || Johnson (4–13) || Stanton (4) || Yankee Stadium || 8,875 || 90–53
|- bgcolor="bbffbb"
| 144 || September 10  || Orioles || 3–1 || Weaver (9–11) || Ponson (7–6) || Karsay (11) || Yankee Stadium || 31,270 || 91–53
|- bgcolor="bbffbb"
| 145 || September 11 || Orioles || 5–4  || Karsay (6–4) || Bauer (6–7) || — || Yankee Stadium || 35,183 || 92–53
|- bgcolor="bbffbb"
| 146 || September 12 || Orioles || 7–3 || Wells (17–7) || Douglass (0–3) || — || Yankee Stadium || 33,263 || 93–53
|- bgcolor="ffbbbb"
| 147 || September 13 || White Sox || 2–13 || Biddle (2–3) || Mussina (16–10) || Osuna (11) || Yankee Stadium || 45,935 || 93–54
|- bgcolor="ffbbbb"
| 148 || September 14 || White Sox || 1–8 || Wright (12–12) || Clemens (12–6) || — || Yankee Stadium || 44,795 || 93–55
|- bgcolor="bbffbb"
| 149 || September 15 || White Sox || 8–4  || Pettitte (11–5) || Porzio (2–1) || — || Yankee Stadium || 39,587 || 94–55
|- bgcolor="ffbbbb"
| 150 || September 17 || @ Devil Rays || 7–9 || Carter (1–0) || Mendoza (8–4) || — || Tropicana Field || 14,797 || 94–56
|- bgcolor="bbffbb"
| 151 || September 18 || @ Devil Rays || 7–1 || Weaver (10–11) || Zambrano (6–8) || — || Tropicana Field || 14,993 || 94–57
|- bgcolor="ffbbbb"
| 152 || September 19 || @ Devil Rays || 2–3  || Yan (7–8) || Hitchcock (1–2) || — || Tropicana Field || 18,557 || 95–57
|- bgcolor="bbffbb"
| 153 || September 20 || @ Tigers || 5–1 || Clemens (13–6) || Van Hekken (1–2) || — || Comerica Park || 25,364 || 96–57
|- bgcolor="bbffbb"
| 154 || September 21 || @ Tigers || 3–2 || Pettitte (12–5) || Beverlin (0–2) || Karsay (12) || Comerica Park || 25,432 || 97–57
|- bgcolor="bbffbb"
| 155 || September 22 || @ Tigers || 4–3 || Wells (18–7) || Maroth (6–9)|| Stanton (5) || Comerica Park || 23,930 || 98–57 
|- bgcolor="ffbbbb"
| 156 || September 23 || Devil Rays || 2–3 || Zambrano (7–8) || O. Hernandez (8–5) || Yan (19) || Yankee Stadium || 31,937 || 98–58
|- bgcolor="bbffbb"
| 157 || September 24 || Devil Rays || 6–0 || Mussina (17–10) || Harper (5–9) || — || Yankee Stadium || 32,492 || 99–58
|- bgcolor="bbffbb"
| 158 || September 25 || Devil Rays || 4–3 || Weaver (11–11) || Sturtze (4–18) || Rivera (28) || Yankee Stadium || 30,004 || 100–58
|- bgcolor="bbbbbb"
| – || September 26 || Devil Rays || colspan=8|Cancelled (rain)
|- bgcolor="bbffbb"
| 159 || September 27 || @ Orioles || 6–2 || Pettitte (13–5) || Ponson (7–9) || — || Oriole Park at Camden Yards || 40,975 || 101–58
|- bgcolor="bbffbb
| 160 || September 28 || @ Orioles || 4–2 ||  Wells (19–7) || Driskill (8–8) || Stanton (6) || Oriole Park at Camden Yards || 48,165 || 102–58
|- bgcolor="bbffbb"
| 161 || September 29 || @ Orioles || 6–1 || Mussina (18–10) || Stephens (2–5) || — || Oriole Park at Camden Yards || 46,443 || 103–58
|-

Player stats

Starters by position
Note: Pos = Position; G = Games played; AB = At bats; H = Hits; Avg. = Batting average; HR = Home runs; RBI = Runs batted in

Other batters
Note: G = Games played; AB = At bats; H = Hits; Avg. = Batting average; HR = Home runs; RBI = Runs batted in

Starting pitchers
Note: G = Games, IP = Innings pitched; W = Wins; L = Losses; ERA = Earned run average; SO = Strikeouts

Other pitchers
Note: G = Games; IP = Innings pitched; W = Wins; L = Losses; ERA = Earned run average; SO = Strikeouts

Relief pitchers
Note: G = Games; W = Wins; L = Losses; SV = Saves; ERA = Earned run average; SO = Strikeouts

 Postseason 
 Game log 

|- bgcolor="bbffbb"
| 1 || October 1 || Angels || 8–5 || Karsay (1–0) || Weber (0–1) || Rivera (1) || Yankee Stadium || 56,710 || 1–0
|- bgcolor="ffbbbb"
| 2 || October 2 || Angels || 6–8 || Rodriguez (1–0) || Hernandez (0–1) || Percival (1) || Yankee Stadium || 56,695 || 1–1
|- bgcolor="ffbbbb"
| 3 || October 4 || @ Angels || 6–9 || Rodriguez (2–0) || Stanton (0–1) || Percival (2) || Edison International Field of Anaheim || 45,072 || 1–2
|- bgcolor="ffbbbb"
| 4 || October 5 || @ Angels || 5–9 || Washburn (1–0) || Wells' (0–1) || — || Edison International Field of Anaheim || 45,067 || 1–3
|-

ALDS

   
Anaheim's victory secured their place in the American League Championship Series, where they defeated the Minnesota Twins, and subsequently the San Francisco Giants to win the World Series.

This was the first time since 1997 that the Yankees failed to win the American League pennant and advance to the World Series.

Awards and records
 Jason Giambi, Silver Slugger Award
Alfonso Soriano, Most home runs in one season by an American League second baseman (39)

Farm system

LEAGUE CHAMPIONS: Norwich, Staten IslandBaseball America 2003 Annual Directory

References

External links
2002 New York Yankees at Baseball Reference2002 New York Yankees at Baseball Almanac''

New York Yankees seasons
New York Yankees
New York Yankees
2000s in the Bronx
American League East champion seasons